Mlaka pri Kranju is an urbanized settlement just north of Kranj in the Upper Carniola region of Slovenia.

Name
The name of the settlement was changed from Mlaka to Mlaka pri Kranju in 1955.

References

External links

Mlaka pri Kranju on Geopedia

Populated places in the City Municipality of Kranj